The Dime Community Bank, originally known as the Dime Savings Bank of Williamsburgh, is a local, FDIC-insured bank headquartered in Hauppauge, NY. Founded in 1864, the bank was originally based in the Williamsburg neighborhood of Brooklyn, New York, and continues to operate with a strong market presence in this area. In 2017, Dime moved its headquarters to Brooklyn Heights. On Monday, February 1, 2021, Bridge Bancorp Inc. (BNB Bank) and Dime Community Bancshares (Dime Community Bank) successfully closed on a merger of equals. The bank headquarters is currently in Hauppauge, NY.

History 
Dime Community Bank first opened in Brooklyn on June 1, 1864. Founded by William Grandy, Dime was established as a mutual savings bank serving the growing immigrant and low-income populations in the area.

Dime weathered a series of economic ups and downs as conditions in Williamsburg changed, finally incorporating and becoming a publicly traded company on June 26, 1996. At the same time, Dime acquired Conestoga Bancorp, Inc. and its wholly owned subsidiary, Pioneer Savings Bank, making it the first simultaneous IPO/acquisition of its kind in the nation.

In 1999, Dime acquired Financial Bancorp, Inc. (Financial Federal Savings Bank) for $74 million.

The bank is a wholly owned subsidiary of Dime Community Bancshares, Inc. (NASDAQ: DCOM), a publicly owned company. Dime Community Bancshares posted $6.7 billion in consolidated assets as of December 31, 2020. Dime finished among the top 5 on the S&P Global Market Intelligence thrift ranking ("S&P Global") for 9 consecutive years, from 2009 to 2017.

In 2017, Dime began to shift their focus to commercial and business banking. In August 2017, Dime announced they had been approved as a Small Business Administration (SBA) lender. The CEO, Kenneth J. Mahon, said, “the launch of our SBA lending program continues the expansion of our Business Banking division...We recognize that small businesses and entrepreneurs are important to the economic vibrancy of the communities we serve.”

Dime Community Bank operates 60+ branches throughout the New York metropolitan area in Brooklyn, Queens, the Bronx, Nassau, and Suffolk .

Notable buildings 

Dime Community Bank's first location was in the basement of the First National Bank Building at the base of the Williamsburg Bridge, where it opened on June 1, 1864. Having outgrown the First National Bank building, Dime moved its headquarters to a new development in the Williamsburg Bridge Plaza on the corner of Havemeyer and South 5th Street. On January 16, 2017, Dime moved to its current headquarters at 300 Cadman Plaza West, Brooklyn, NY.

The Havemeyer Street building at 209 Havemeyer Street, or 257 South 5th Street, was designated a New York City landmark by the New York City Landmarks Preservation Commission on March 27, 2018. The building was constructed in 1906–08, and was designed in the Neoclassical style by the firm of Helmle & Huberty.

References

External links 

 

Banks established in 1864
Cooperative banks in the United States
Banks based in New York City
New York City Designated Landmarks in Brooklyn
2021 mergers and acquisitions
Companies listed on the Nasdaq